S. J. Rozan is an American architect and writer of detective fiction and thrillers, based in New York City. She also co-writes a paranormal thriller series under the pseudonym Sam Cabot with Carlos Dews.

Life and career
S.J. (Shira Judith) Rozan was born in 1950 in the Bronx, New York. She grew up with two sisters and a brother, and has a passion for basketball. She graduated from Oberlin College with a bachelor's degree, and received a master's in architecture from the State University of New York at Buffalo. She is a lifelong New Yorker and currently lives in Lower Manhattan.

Before her career as an architect, Rozan also worked as a janitor, in jewelry sales, painting houses, book sales, bread baking, as an advertising copywriter, and as a self-defense instructor.  As an architect, she became project manager for a New York firm working on socially useful projects. She said, "That life was exactly what I wanted, but it wasn't making me happy.... So I decided to go back to this idea I'd had of writing a crime novel."

Rozan's books are set in New York City or start out there. Her P.I. series features Lydia Chin and Bill Smith, and the books alternate point of view between the two characters. About them she has revealed, "Lydia is me as I was when I was her age. She’s optimistic and full of energy. She believes that the world can be saved.... Bill, on the other hand, is me as I am now—on a bad day. He’s been through enough bad stuff in his life that he knows what can’t be done."

In 2013 she co-authored a book with Carlos Dews under the name Sam Cabot. This book was set in Rome and is the first in a series of historical thrillers. In addition to crime novels, since 2004, Rozan has written haiku that she posts each weekend to her blog. They are composed as she makes observations, but aren't written down until she gets home.

Rozan speaks, lectures, and teaches widely, including in January 2003 as an invited speaker at the annual meeting of the World Economic Forum in Davos, Switzerland; as a Master Artist at the Atlantic Center for the Arts in Fall 2006; at the 2009 National Book Festival; speaking about "Every Story Is a Mystery" at the Central Library in Indianapolis in October 2009; as keynote speaker at the California Crime Writers Conference in June 2011; in Fall 2011 as an instructor at the New York Crime Fiction Academy; as a Writer-in-Residence at Singapore Management University in February 2014; as Author-in-Residence & Guest Instructor at 2014 Novel-In-Progress Bookcamp; and during summers in Assisi, Italy at Art Workshop International as a Writing Instructor. She gives freely of her time to other writers as shown by acknowledgments in, among others, the following referenced books:

Bibliography

Lydia Chin / Bill Smith series
China Trade  (1994), St. Martin's. 
Concourse  (1995), St. Martin's.  : 1996 Shamus Award, Best P.I. Novel
Mandarin Plaid  (1996), St. Martin's. 
No Colder Place  (1997), St. Martin's.  : 1998 Anthony Award, Best Novel    : 1998 Barry Award, Best Novel; 1998 Shamus Award, Best P.I. Novel
A Bitter Feast  (1998), St. Martin's. 
Stone Quarry  (1999), St. Martin's.     : 2000 Shamus Award, Best P.I. Novel
Reflecting the Sky  (2001), St. Martin's.  : 2002 Shamus Award, Best P.I. Novel    : 2002 Edgar Award, Best Novel; 2002 Anthony Award, Best Novel
Winter and Night  (2002), St. Martin's.  : 2003 Edgar Award, Best Novel; 2003 Nero Award, Excellence in Mystery Genre; 2003 Macavity Award, Best Mystery Novel; 2009 Maltese Falcon Award, Best Hardboiled Novel - Japan    : 2003 Anthony Award, Best Novel; 2003 Barry Award, Best Novel; 2003 Shamus Award, Best P.I. Novel
The Shanghai Moon  (2009), St. Martin's.     : 2010 Anthony Award, Best Novel; 2010 Barry Award, Best Novel; 2010 Dilys Award
On the Line  (2010), St. Martin's. 
Ghost Hero  (2011), St. Martin's.  : 2012 Dilys Award
Paper Son  (2019), Pegasus Crime. 
 The Art of Violence  (2020) Pegasus Crime. 
 Family Business  (2021) Pegasus Crime.  : 2022 Shamus Award, Best P.I. Novel    : 2022 Sue Grafton Memorial Award

Standalone novels/chapters
Absent Friends (2004), Delacorte Press.     : 2005 Gumshoe Award, Best Mystery, set against the aftermath of 9/11
In This Rain (2006), Delacorte Press.     : 2008 Nero Award, Excellence in Mystery Genre
"Chapter 4", The Chopin Manuscript: A Serial Thriller, idea by Jeffery Deaver, audiobook: ITW & Audible.com (chapters originally delivered serially: Sept 25–Nov 13, 2007) : 2008 Audie Award, Audiobook of the Year       Center Point Publishing Large Print (2010), pp. 69–77.        Part I, Watchlist: A Serial Thriller, Vanguard Press (2010). 
"Chapter 13", Inherit the Dead: A Novel (serial) (2013), intro. Lee Child, Touchstone, pp. 171–180.

Writing as Sam Cabot
Blood of the Lamb: A Novel of Secrets (2013), Blue Rider. 
Skin of the Wolf: A Novel (2014), Blue Rider. 
Sam Cabot books are co-written with Carlos Dews

Short story collections
A Tale About a Tiger and Other Mysterious Events (2009), Crippen & Landru.  A volume of nine previously published short stories: "Film at Eleven" · "Hoops" · "Seeing the Moon" · "Passline" · "Night Court" · "Subway" · "A Tale About a Tiger" · "Childhood" · "Double-Crossing Delancey"
Building and Other Stories (2011).  An e-book collection of seven previously published short stories: "Building" · "Night Court" · "Going Home" · "Silverfish" · "Seeing the Moon" · "I Seen That" · "Sunset"

Short stories
In 2022, Rozan was recognized with the Edward D. Hoch Memorial Golden Derringer for Lifetime Achievement by the Short Mystery Fiction Society.

"Heartbreak"    (e-book single available)P.I. Magazine, Winter 1990, Vol.3 No.1, pp. 16–21.
"Once Burned"  P.I. Magazine, Winter 1991, Vol.4 No.1, pp. 18–26.       Lethal Ladies (1996), ed. Barbara Collins & Robert J. Randisi
"Prosperity Restaurant"   (e-book single available)The Fourth Woman Sleuth Anthology (1991), ed. Irene Zahava, pp. 111–135.        Lethal Ladies II (1998), ed. Christine Matthews & Robert J. Randisi
"Hot Numbers" P.I. Magazine, Spring 1992, Vol.5 No.1, pp. 16–23.
"Body English"  (e-book single available)Alfred Hitchcock Mystery Magazine, December 1992, Vol.37 No.12, pp. 24–41.       Alfred Hitchcock’s Mystery Magazine Presents Fifty Years of Crime and Suspense (2006), ed. Linda Landrigan       Women of Mystery II (1994), ed. Cynthia Manson
"Film at Eleven" Deadly Allies II (1994), ed. Robert J. Randisi & Susan Dunlap, pp. 202–229.        A Tale About a Tiger and Other Mysterious Events (collected stories)
"Birds of Paradise"  (e-book single available)Alfred Hitchcock Mystery Magazine, December 1994, Vol.39 No.13, pp. 142–154.       Wild Crimes (2004), ed. Dana Stabenow
"Hoops" Ellery Queen Mystery Magazine, January 1996, Vol.107 No.1, pp. 40–68.    : 1997 Edgar Award, Best Short Story       The Year’s 25 Finest Crime & Mystery Stories; Sixth Annual Ed (1997), ed. Joan Hess, Ed Gorman & Martin H. Greenberg       The Best American Mystery Stories 1997, ed. Robert B. Parker & Otto Penzler       Crime After Crime (1999), ed. Joan Hess, Martin H. Greenberg & Ed Gorman       Crème de La Crime (2000), ed. Janet Hutchings       A Tale About a Tiger and Other Mysterious Events (collected stories)
"Subway" Vengeance Is Hers (1997), ed. Mickey Spillane & Max Allan Collins, pp. 225–252.        A Tale About a Tiger and Other Mysterious Events (collected stories)
"A Tale about a Tiger"  (e-book single available)Sounds Like Murder, Vol VI (1999), ed. Otto Penzler. (audio cassette)        Criminal Records (2000), ed. Otto Penzler       A Tale About a Tiger and Other Mysterious Events (collected stories)
"Cooking the Hounds" (e-book single available)Canine Crimes (1998), presented by Jeffrey Marks, pp. 145–154. 
"Hunting for Doyle" (e-book single available)Ellery Queen Mystery Magazine, May 1999, Vol.113 No.5, pp. 58–63.
"Childhood" Compulsion, e-book; Mightywords.com, (Sept 2000).       The World’s Finest Mystery & Crime Stories; Second Annual Collection (2001), ed. Ed Gorman
"Marking the Boat" The Shamus Game (The Private Eye Writers of America Presents) (2000), ed. Robert J. Randisi, pp. 1–38. 
"The Grift of the Magi"commissioned by Otto Penzler, who gifted his bookshop clients. LCCN 2001281539       Christmas at the Mysterious Bookshop (2010), ed. Otto Penzler
"Motormouth"Ellery Queen Mystery Magazine, April 2001, Vol.117 No.4, pp. 60–61.
"Double-Crossing Delancey"  (e-book single available)Mystery Street (The Private Eye Writers of America Presents) (2001), ed. Robert J. Randisi, pp. 278–310.  : 2002 Edgar Award, Best Short Story    : 2002 Anthony Award, Best Short Fiction       The World’s Finest Mystery and Crime Stories; Third Annual Collection (2002) ed. Ed Gorman & Martin H. Greenberg       A Tale About a Tiger and Other Mysterious Events (collected stories)
"Going Home"The Mysterious North (2002), ed. Dana Stabenow, pp. 169–175.        The Longman Anthology of Detective Fiction (2004), ed. Deane Mansfield-Kelley & Lois A. Marchino         Death by Pen: The Longman Anthology of Detective Fiction from Poe to Paretsky (2007), ed. Mansfield-Kelley & Marchino       Building and Other Stories (collection of stories)
"The Last Kiss"Dangerous Women (2005), ed. Otto Penzler, pp. 281–290. 
"Passline"Murder in Vegas: New Crime Tales of Gambling and Desperation (2005), ed. Michael Connelly, pp. 19–30.        A Tale About a Tiger and Other Mysterious Events (collected stories)
"Shots" Murder at the Foul Line: Original Tales of Hoop Dreams and Deaths from Today’s Great Writers (2006), ed. Otto Penzler, pp. 264–306.  
"Building"Manhattan Noir (2006), ed. Lawrence Block,  pp. 196–212.     : 2007 Edgar Award, Best Short Story       Building and Other Stories (collection of stories)       New York City Noir: The Five Borough Collection (2012)
"The Next Nice Day"Deadly Housewives (2006), ed. Christine Matthews, pp. 199–205, plus Afterword. 
"Sunset"Hardboiled Brooklyn (2006), ed. Reed Farrel Coleman, pp. 85–96.        Building and Other Stories (collection of stories)
"Hothouse"Bronx Noir (2007), edited SJR, pp. 177–190.         The Best American Mystery Stories 2008, ed. George Pelecanos & Otto Penzler       New York City Noir: The Five Borough Collection (2012)
"Undocumented"A Hell of a Woman: An Anthology of Female Noir (2007), ed. Megan Abbott, pp. 288–298. 
"Seeing the Moon"  (e-book single available)On a Raven’s Wing: New Tales in Honor of Edgar Allan Poe (2009), ed. Stuart M. Kaminsky, pp. 303–327.        A Tale About a Tiger and Other Mysterious Events (collected stories)       By Hook or By Crook and 27 More of the Best Crime + Mystery Stories of the Year (2010), ed. Ed Gorman & Martin H. Greenberg       Building and Other Stories (collection of stories)
"Silverfish"Ellery Queen Mystery Magazine, March/April 2009, Vol.133 Nos.3&4, pp. 76–83.       Building and Other Stories (collection of stories)       The Crooked Road, Vol. 2 (2013), ed. Janet Hutchings
"Night Court"MWA Presents The Prosecution Rests: New Stories about Courtrooms, Criminals, and the Law (2009), ed. Linda Fairstein, pp. 326–332.        A Tale About a Tiger and Other Mysterious Events (collected stories)       Building and Other Stories (collection of stories)
"Cold, Hard Facts"Two of the Deadliest: New Tales of Lust, Greed, and Murder (2009), ed. Elizabeth George, pp. 313–325. 
"I Seen That"Once Upon a Crime: An Anthology of Murder, Mayhem and Suspense (2009), ed. Gary R. Bush & Chris Everheart, pp. 243–245.        Building and Other Stories (collection of stories)
"Daybreak"The Dark End of the Street: New Stories of Sex and Crime (2010), co-edited with Jonathan Santlofer, pp. 247–257.  
"Chin Yong-Yun Takes a Case"  (e-book single available)Damn Near Dead 2 (2010), ed. Bill Crider, pp. 229–240.        The Best American Mystery Stories 2011, ed. Harlan Coben & Otto Penzler
"Iterations"MWA Presents The Rich and the Dead (2011), ed. Nelson DeMille, pp. 295–308. 
"The Path"Home Improvement: Undead Edition - All-new tales of hauned home repair and surreal estates (2011), ed. Charlaine Harris & Toni L.P. Kelner, pp. 211–236. 
"The Men with the Twisted Lips"A Study in Sherlock: Stories Inspired by the Holmes Canon (2011), ed. Laurie R. King & Leslie S. Klinger, pp. 44–59. 
"New Day Newark"New Jersey Noir (2011), ed. Joyce Carol Oates, pp. 61–75. 
"Occupy This!"Scoundrels: Tales of Greed, Murder and Financial Crimes (2012), ed. Gary Phillips, pp. 85–94. 
"Hero"The Green Hornet: Still At Large! (2012), ed. Joe Gentile, Win Scott Eckert & Matthew Baugh, pp. 1–13. 
"Lighthouse"Staten Island Noir (2012), ed. Patricia Smith, pp. 233–252.        New York City Noir: The Five Borough Collection (2012)       USA Noir: The Best of the Akashic Noir Series (2013), ed. Johnny Temple
"Golden Chance"Ellery Queen Mystery Magazine, December 2012, Vol.140 No.6, pp. 2–17.       EQMM's Fiction Podcasts, Episode 44 (49:34), posted April 1, 2013, read by author
"Escape Velocity" Ride 2: More short fiction about bicycles (2012), ed. Keith Snyder, pp. 1–13. 
"Falconer"Mondays Are Murder: Akashic Books website, May 6, 2013.
"Kena Sai"Singapore Noir (2014), ed. Cheryl Lu-Lien Tan, pp. 109–122. 
"Wet Dog on a Rainy Day"Dark City Lights: New York Stories (2015), ed. Lawrence Block, pp. 324–328. 
"Chin Yong-Yun Makes a Shiddach" Manhattan Mayhem: New Crime Stories from Mystry Writers of America (2015), ed. Mary Higgins Clark, pp. 281–294. 
"Chin Yong-Yun Helps a Fool" Ellery Queen Mystery Magazine, September/October 2018, Vol.152 No.3&4, pp. 2–18. : 2019 Shamus Award, Best Short Story

Poetry

211 Haiku (September 2012) - An e-book collection of 211 selected works, from 2004–2011, that follows a calendar year cycle

Non-fiction essays and articles
"The Private Eye: An American Hero" (2009), Crippen & Landru, 8 p. pamphlet. OCLC 672293661 (Collection of three columns, edited, written for the Private Eye Writers of America)From inside back cover: "Two hundred twenty-five copies were printed to accompany the limited edition of A Tale About a Tiger and Other Mysterious Events, and are not for sale separately."
"Who Is Silverman, What Is She?", In Pursuit of Spenser: Mystery Writers on Robert B. Parker and the Creation of an American Hero (2012),  ed. Otto Penzler,  Smart Pop, pp. 163–172.  
"Part 2: Tips and Tales: Categorisation and its discontents", The Arvon Book of Crime and Thriller Writing (2012), eds. Michelle Spring & Laurie R. King, Bloomsbury Publishing, pp. 150–153. 
"True confessions by John Gregory Dunne (1977)", Books to Die For (2012), eds. John Connolly & Declan Burke, Hodder & Stoughton, pp. 421–426.

References

External links

 Official S. J. Rozan website
 S. J. Rozan's archived (2003-2016) blog
  (interview index)
 On the Trail of S.J. Rozan - a resource page
 How I Got To Be (½ of) Sam Cabot
 

1950 births
Living people
20th-century American novelists
20th-century American women writers
21st-century American novelists
21st-century American women writers
American mystery writers
American thriller writers
American women novelists
Anthony Award winners
Dilys Award winners
Edgar Award winners
English-language haiku poets
Macavity Award winners
Maltese Falcon Award winners
Nero Award winners
Oberlin College alumni
People from the Bronx
Writers from Manhattan
Shamus Award winners
University at Buffalo alumni
Women mystery writers
American women short story writers
21st-century American poets
American women poets
Women thriller writers
20th-century American short story writers
21st-century American short story writers
Novelists from New York (state)
21st-century pseudonymous writers
Pseudonymous women writers